The so-called Republic of Crema (Lombard: Republega Cremasca) was a revolutionary municipality in Lombardy, which was created when the French army entered Crema on 28 March 1797. It ruled the local affairs of the city and its neighbourhood, which previously were a Venetian exclave in the Duchy of Milan. The municipality entered then into the Cisalpine Republic in July 1797.

History 

The city of Crema and its surroundings had been annexed by the Republic of Venice since 1449, and had been ruled by a Venetian podestà for more than three centuries. On 28 March 1797 a troop of French dragoons entered and occupied the city (without facing any resistance) and arrested the last Venetian magistrate, the duke Zan Battista Contarini.

A new municipality was formed to control the city, which was composed mostly of small landowners and local nobles. They proclaimed then the new Republic of Crema, that had the control of the town and the territories previously belonging to the province of Crema.

The small revolutionary republic had a short life. Three months later, on 29 July 1797, its territory merged with the Cisalpine Republic and legally annexed to it on the base of the Treaty of Campo Formio, becoming part of the Adda department and later on the Alto Po one.

Nowadays the territory of the former Republic of Crema goes from the municipality of Spino d'Adda (east) to the Castelleone one.

Flag and coat of arms 

The republic used a simple white flag with the coat of arms.

See also 
 Fall of the Republic of Venice

References 

Crema, Republic of
History of Lombardy
States and territories established in 1797
Client states of the Napoleonic Wars
1797 in Europe